The 1991 season in Swedish football, starting January 1991 and ending December 1991:

Events 
The 1991 and 1992 seasons of the Swedish national leagues were played using a very unusual and complicated system involving separate leagues for spring and autumn, where teams playing at different levels during the spring could be playing in the same league during the autumn. It was even possible for a team playing in the third level (Division 2) at the start of the season to gain promotion to the first level (Allsvenskan) for the start of the next season. The footnotes linked at top of each league table and play-off round gives a full explanation of the promotion and relegation rules for the league or play-off in question.

Honours

Official titles

Competitions

Promotions, relegations and qualifications

Promotions

League transfers

Relegations

International qualifications

Domestic results

Spring 1991

Allsvenskan 1991

Division 1 Norra 1991

Division 1 Östra 1991

Division 1 Västra 1991

Division 1 Södra 1991

Autumn 1991

Mästerskapsserien 1991

Kvalsvenskan 1991

Allsvenskan qualification play-off 1991 
1st round

2nd round

3rd round

Höstettan Norra 1991

Höstettan Östra 1991

Höstettan Västra 1991

Höstettan Södra 1991

Division 1 promotion play-off 1991 
1st round

2nd round

Kvalettan Norra 1991

Kvalettan Södra 1991

Svenska Cupen 1990–91 
Final

Svenska Cupen 1991 
Final

National team results

Notes

References 
Print

Online

 
Seasons in Swedish football